Friðrik Ólafsson (born 26 January 1935) is an Icelandic chess grandmaster. He was president of FIDE from 1978 to 1982. He is a six-time Icelandic Chess Champion and a two-time Nordic Chess Champion.

Chess career
Friðrik was born in Reykjavík, Iceland. A first-time winner of the Icelandic Chess Championship in 1952 and of the Nordic Chess Championship a year later, he rapidly became recognised as the strongest Icelandic chess player of his generation. Friðrik's first result of international note was his shared first with Viktor Korchnoi at Hastings 1955–56.

Friðrik's best result in World Chess Championship competition was in the 1958 Interzonal tournament, where he finished equal 5th–6th, automatically earning the grandmaster title (the first for Iceland) and qualifying for the 1959 Candidates Tournament, the last stage to determine the challenger to the World Chess Champion in 1960. In the Candidates Tournament, however, he finished seventh of eight with 10/28. He also played in the following Interzonal in 1962, but failed to qualify for the Candidates. 

Among his other best tournament results were joint third in the first Piatigorsky Cup, Los Angeles 1963, with 7½/14 and shared first with Ljubomir Ljubojević at Wijk aan Zee 1976, ahead of Mikhail Tal. According to Chessmetrics, Olafsson at his best was rated 2692 on the October 1958 rating list, ranked #13 in world.

Olafsson continued to play occasionally into the 21st century, winning a rapid match against fellow veteran Bent Larsen in 2003 by a score of 5–3.

Friðrik usually played the Sicilian Defence against 1.e4 and the King's Indian Defence and Nimzo-Indian Defence against 1.d4. With White, he usually played the English Opening, but he also played 1.d4, 1.e4 and 1.Nf3 many times.

FIDE president
In 1978, Olafsson succeeded Max Euwe as President of the international chess governing body FIDE. During the tenure he presided over the 1981 Karpov–Korchnoi World Championship match. Since Korchnoi defected from the Soviet Union in 1976, the Soviets were holding Korchnoi's son, Igor. Olafsson delayed the planned September 19 start date of the match in a bid to get the Soviets to release Korchnoi's son. For this attempt, Olafsson drew the wrath of the Soviets, who then backed the FIDE Vice-President, Florencio Campomanes, for the Presidency of FIDE. Campomanes succeeded Olafsson as FIDE president in 1982.

Personal life
In life outside of chess, Friðrik is married and has two adult daughters. 

Prior to 1974, when he became a chess professional, he worked as a lawyer at the Icelandic Ministry of Justice. After the FIDE presidency in 1982, Olafsson was appointed Secretary to the Icelandic Parliament.

References

Sources
 Chess magazine, January 1979 – Interview with David Levy
 The KGB Plays Chess – Yuri Felshtinsky

External links

 
 

1935 births
Living people
Fridrick Olafsson
Chess grandmasters
Fridrick Olafsson
Presidents of FIDE
Chess officials